This is a list of computing mascots. A mascot is any person, animal, or object thought to bring luck, or anything used to represent a group with a common public identity. In case of computing mascots, they either represent software, hardware, or any project or collective entity behind them.

See also
 List of video game mascots
 OS-tan

References

Notes

Citations

Mascots